Whelen Springs is a town in Clark County, Arkansas, United States. The population was 92 at the 2010 census. From 1930 through 1939 the town thrived, being a main hub of operations for the then powerful Ozan Lumber Company.

Geography
Arkansas Highway 53 passes through the town, leading north  to Gurdon and south  to Bluff City, via Highway 24.

Demographics

As of the census of 2000, there were 84 people, 41 households, and 25 families residing in the town. The population density was 141.0/km (368.6/mi2). There were 47 housing units at an average density of 78.9/km (206.3/mi2). The racial makeup of the town was 94.05% White, 4.76% Black or African American, and 1.19% from two or more races.

There were 41 households, out of which 26.8% had children under the age of 18 living with them, 56.1% were married couples living together, 2.4% had a female householder with no husband present, and 39.0% were non-families. 36.6% of all households were made up of individuals, and 22.0% had someone living alone who was 65 years of age or older. The average household size was 2.05 and the average family size was 2.60.

In the town, the population was spread out, with 14.3% under the age of 18, 9.5% from 18 to 24, 31.0% from 25 to 44, 27.4% from 45 to 64, and 17.9% who were 65 years of age or older. The median age was 43 years. For every 100 females, there were 127.0 males. For every 100 females age 18 and over, there were 118.2 males.

The median income for a household in the town was $19,286, and the median income for a family was $19,792. Males had a median income of $24,688 versus $16,500 for females. The per capita income for the town was $10,852. There were 18.5% of families and 13.5% of the population living below the poverty line, including 22.2% of under eighteens and 13.0% of those over 64.

Education
The Gurdon School District, which operates Gurdon High School, serves the community.

References

Towns in Clark County, Arkansas
Towns in Arkansas